The 30th government of Turkey (27 October 1965 – 3 November 1969) was a government in the history of Turkey. It is also called the first Demirel government.

Background 
Justice Party (AP) won the elections held on 10 October 1965 by a landslide. Süleyman Demirel, the leader of AP, founded the government.

The government
In the list below, the serving period of cabinet members who served only a part of the cabinet's lifespan are shown in the column "Notes". As according to the Turkish constitution of 1961, some members of the government were replaced by independent members before the elections.

Aftermath
The government ended because of the elections held on 12 October 1969. AP won the elections, and Süleyman Demirel founded the next government as well.

References

Cabinets of Turkey
Justice Party (Turkey) politicians
1965 establishments in Turkey
1969 disestablishments in Turkey
Cabinets established in 1965
Cabinets disestablished in 1969
Members of the 30th government of Turkey
13th parliament of Turkey
Justice Party (Turkey)